Perry-McIlwain-McDow House, also known as Fairview Farm, is a historic home located near Lancaster, Lancaster County, South Carolina. It was built about 1840, and is a -story, Greek Revival raised cottage.  It has a temple-front classical portico containing a recessed porch with balustrade.

It was added to the National Register of Historic Places in 2011.

References

Houses on the National Register of Historic Places in South Carolina
Houses completed in 1840
Greek Revival houses in South Carolina
Houses in Lancaster County, South Carolina
National Register of Historic Places in Lancaster County, South Carolina